Batushka (stylized in Cyrillic as БАТЮШКА) is a Polish black metal band formed by Krzysztof Drabikowski. Their music and lyrics, which are written exclusively in Church Slavonic language, are inspired by the Eastern Orthodox Church. The band members wear habits and Eastern Orthodox schemas during live performances to conceal their identities. In contrast with many other black metal bands, they use eight-string guitars.

A falling out between Drabikowski and vocalist Bartłomiej Krysiuk in 2018 led to Krysiuk starting his own version of Batushka, which released its own recordings and performs separately from the original band. Drabikowski protested the move and does not consider Krysiuk's band legitimate.

Name 
The word Batushka (Russian Cyrillic: Батюшка), meaning "father", is the titular equivalent of a hieromonk in Eastern Orthodoxy or, broadly, of any Orthodox priest. The transcription used by the band is improper, another possible transcription of Батюшка into Latin would be Batyushka.

History 
Batushka was founded in Białystok in the spring of 2015 by multi instrumentalist Krzysztof "Derph" Drabikowski at his home studio, Sphieratz Productions in Sobolewo; he came up with the idea of combining black metal and traditional liturgical songs of the Orthodox Church after reading comments on YouTube videos of Orthodox music, saying how "God's hymns are more metal than any satanic black metal music out there". Throughout the first quarter of 2015, Drabikowski proceeded to compose and record the music, write the lyrics, paint the artwork for the album and create the band's overall concept by himself until deciding to bring Marcin Bielemiuk to re-record the drum parts in acoustic percussion. Drabikowski originally invited his friend and former Heuresis bandmate Lech to do the vocal parts but dropped out of the project because he didn't know how to write old Church Slavonic.

In July 2015, before adding the finishing touches on the album, Drabikowski recruited Hermh vocalist Bartłomiej Krysiuk to record the vocals. The album was completed in the following months and Drabikowski convinced Krysiuk and Bielemiuk to make Batushka an anonymous project; according to Drabikowski, this was decided in order for the listeners to focus on the musical experience itself, as such and for the next year the band's line up remained unknown to the public and started using monikers in Cyrillic to further conceal their identities.

The group released the single "Yekteníya VII" in November 2015, prior to their debut album Литоургиіа ("Litourgiya") ("Lithurgy") in December. Both recordings were released through Witching Hour Productions, owned by vocalist Bartłomiej Krysiuk. The album was critically acclaimed, with various sites naming Litourgiya one of the best metal albums of 2015, it also became a commercial hit in the Polish metal scene. The album's overwhelming success prompted the band to start touring due to massive demand from various European festivals. The band's live line up featured a total of 8 performers: Drabikowski on lead guitars, Krysiuk on lead vocals, and Bielemiuk on drums alongside 3 backing vocalists, a bassist, and a rhythm guitarist.

Following some regional touring, concerts in Russia and Belarus were also planned, but were canceled due to protests and alleged death threats made against them. This incident also ended the public anonymity of the band's core line up since Drabikowski started doing interviews explaining the situation.

In 2016, together with Behemoth and Bölzer, the group embarked on a concert tour in Poland called Rzeczpospolita Niewierna ("The Republic of the Unfaithful"). In 2017 they performed at Wacken Open Air and Brutal Assault.

In October 2017, the band were signed to Metal Blade Records in the US and rereleased Litourgiya worldwide in both physical media and digital platforms, the signing of the band, however, was done without the knowledge and involvement of founder and main composer Krzysztof Drabikowski.

In April 2018, Marcin Bielemiuk left the project for undisclosed reasons. A year later on 24 May 2019, he stated on a Facebook post that he was fired by Drabikowski after he criticized his attitude and behaviour toward him, Krysiuk and the rest of the band's live performers.

Split with key members 
On 23 December 2018, Drabikowski announced via the Batushka Instagram account that he had decided to part ways with vocalist Bartłomiej Krysiuk "due to inappropriate behaviour on his part." In the same post, Drabikowski stated that "There were attempts to take my creation Batushka away from me" and "the upcoming album Панихида ("Requiem") will not feature his voice".

The following week, the post was taken down and a new post stated that Drabikowski "was told earlier this month that he would not participate in Batushka activities as we move into 2019" and that any pages operated by him were to be shut down based on a claim "based on intellectual property and trademark ownership".

In a counter-claim, Drabikowski uploaded a video statement claiming that Krysiuk had been pressing him to release the new album and, when he disagreed, Krysiuk then "hired musicians to produce an album that he planned to release as the new Batushka record, behind [his] back". He also stated that he had taken legal action, being advised by his lawyer to not say anything further and that pictures on the website and Facebook page were of Krysiuk and people like his son pretending to be Batushka.

On 6 May 2019, Drabikowski released an update on the court proceedings, stating that the court decided that Bartłomiej Krysiuk cannot tour under the name "Batushka" or release new music under the moniker until the proceedings are over. Despite the uncertainty of the band's status, tour dates have been committed to from June 2019 and onward. Krysiuk also stated that he had no intention of honoring the court's decision. A month later Krysiuk posted an update where his legal team succeeded in appealing a reversal of the court's decision that forbade him from using the "Batushka" moniker for touring and merchandising while the case proceeds, however, Drabikowski is still allowed to use the band name in various capacities in spite of Krysiuk's attempts at censoring him through bans and takedowns on Bandcamp and social media.

On 13 May 2019, Drabikowski's Batushka released a song through their own YouTube account from their upcoming album Панихида ("Requiem"), called "Песнь I" ("Ode 1").

On 15 May 2019, Krysiuk's Batushka released the first single through Metal Blade's YouTube account from their upcoming album Господи ("God Almighty"), called "Chapter I: The Emptiness – Polunosznica (Полунощница)". Their album was scheduled to be released on 12 July 2019.
Subsequent music videos were made for the songs "Wieczernia", "Liturgiya", "Utrenia" and "Pierwyj Czas" but due to backlash from supporters of Drabikowski all music videos had the likes/dislikes and comment sections disabled on YouTube. Posts about Batushka on Metal Blade's Instagram also had their comments disabled. These actions stirred even more fan backlash.

On 27 May 2019, Drabikowski's Batushka released a new full-length album called Панихида ("Panihida") ("Requiem") and was very well received by both critics and fans alike.

On 12 July 2019, Krysiuk's Batushka released a full-length album called Hospodi ("God Almighty"), the album received mixed reviews from critics and was panned by some of the band's fans, with most of the criticism aimed at their "illegitimacy" to use the name Batushka.

In the wake of the public falling out and ensuing drama between Drabikowski and Krysiuk several parody bands using variations of the "Batushka" name emerged online as a widespread meme, each also claiming to be the "true Batushka", the most notable being "Batyushka" an anonymous project claiming to be from Russia and being actual Orthodox priests and adhering to the Orthodox dogma. Their music is completely instrumental and have independently released over a dozen albums on Bandcamp which were met with indifference and annoyance, as well as mockery from fans of the real band, several people also pointed out how the music uses a drum machine.

Despite the public backlash, Krysiuk's version of the band continued to tour and play at various festivals, notably replacing Dimmu Borgir at Bloodstock Open Air. and beginning a co-headlining European tour with Belphegor 10 November 2021. On 6 September, Krysiuk's Batushka uploaded a trailer for a documentary titled "Batushka: Uncovering the Truth", about the name dispute and the split between Krysiuk and Drabikowski. However, no further updates or a release date have been revealed since the first announcement. Amidst the backlash, Krysiuk's band canceled Australian and North American tours with fellow Polish band Hate. While no official reason was given for the former, Krysiuk later released a statement saying both tours were cancelled due to the costs of the legal battle. Krysiuk later stated the planned European tour would proceed and revealed plans to work on new music, but on 6 January, the European tour was announced to be indefinitely postponed due to an unspecified member of Krysiuk's band having to "undergo medical treatment".

After a prolonged silence, Krzysztof Drabikowski announced on 9 September 2019 that he will be performing Panihida live in its entirety with a new line up at the MonteRay Club in Kyiv on 9 November 2019, the performance was very well received and was reportedly a sold-out event for the venue. Drabikowski has also expressed his hopes of going on a proper tour in 2020. In late October, several dates were confirmed for Drabikowski's version of the band's European tour, and will take place in 2020, with confirmed dates in the Czech Republic, Austria and Germany. Drabikowski's Batushka also joined Malevolent Creation on their European tour from February to March 2020; the tour was a success with many sold-out venues, however the tour was cut short on 11 March, due to the COVID-19 pandemic, the band's scheduled performances at Poland were canceled due to safety concerns, and Krzysztof Drabikowski tested positive of COVID, he was also suffering from cardiac issues and was hospitalized but was able to recover. On 19 January 2020 it was announced that Drabikowski's Batushka was going to perform at the fifth "México Metal Fest" at Monterrey on 14 November 2020, however the festival was postponed twice until September 23, 2022, and the band performed live as scheduled. Drabikowski's Batushka also performed at the Latvian ethnographic and crafts festival Zobens un Lemess on 7 to 9 August 2020 held in Bauska castle grounds. Since recovering from COVID, Drabikowski has been hinting at new Batushka music, sharing photos and videos on his social media.

Due to the COVID-19 pandemic Krysiuk's version of the band was also forced to cancel and postpone performances and tours, he subsequently released 2 EP's; Raskol and Carju Niebiesnyj in August 2020 and March 2021 respectively, as well as a live album on Christmas 2020. All three records were released under Krysiuk's own label Witching Hour Productions, leading to speculations of their deal with Metal Blade amidst the legal case over the Batushka name.

Members 

Up until the dispute

 Христофор (Krzysztof "Derph" Drabikowski) – guitars, bass, vocals, drums
 Варфоломей (Bartłomiej "Bart" Krysiuk) – lead vocals

Former

 Мартин (Marcin "Beny" Bielemiuk) – drums (2015–2018)

Live members up until the dispute

 Błażej Kasprzak – backing vocals (2016–2018)
 Черный Монах (Patryk G.) – backing vocals (2016–2018)
 Jaca (Jacek Wiśniewski) – backing vocals (2016–2018)
 Paluch (Artur Grassmann) – bass (2016–2018)
 Wdowa (Paweł Wdowski) – guitars (2016–2018)
 P. (Paweł Bartulewicz) – guitars (2016)
 Artur Rumiński – guitars (2017–2018)
 Jatzo (Jacek Łazarow) – drums (2018)

Батюшка

 Лех – vocals (2018–present)
 Черный Монах (Patryk G.) – backing vocals (2018–present)
 Jatzo (Jacek Łazarow) – drums (2018–present)

Krysiuk's Batushka

 Paweł Jaroszewicz – drums (2018–present)
 Paluch (Artur Grassmann) – bass (2018–present)
 P. (Paweł Bartulewicz) – guitars (2018–present)
 Błażej Kasprzak – backing vocals (2018–present)
 Jaca (Jacek Wiśniewski) – backing vocals (2018–present)
 Krzysztof Kingbein – drums (2019–present)
 Tarlachan (Rafał Łyszczarz) - guitar

Timeline

Discography

Studio albums 
Drabikowski's Батюшка
 Litourgiya (Witching Hour Productions, 2015)
 Panihida (Sphieratz Productions, 2019)

Krysiuk's Batushka
 Hospodi (Metal Blade Records, 2019)
 Raskol (EP, Witching Hour Productions, 2020)
 Czernaya liturgiya / Black Liturgy (live album, Witching Hour Productions, 2020)
 Carju Niebiesnyj (EP, Witching Hour Productions, 2021)
 МАРИЯ / MARIA (Witching Hour Productions, 2022)

References

External links 

 
 Batushka on Encyclopaedia Metallum

Polish black metal musical groups
Polish musical trios
Metal Blade Records artists